Reed Anthony McKenna (born August 8, 1992) is an American soccer player who currently plays for FC Mulhouse Portland in the National Premier Soccer League.

Early life and education 
McKenna was born in Columbus, Ohio on August 8, 1992.  His family relocated to Hawaii, where he attended Punahou School as a freshman and played on their varsity boys soccer team.  He would later relocate with his family to San Diego, where McKenna attended Rancho Bernardo High School.  He finished his high school career in San Diego and was named as an ESPN RISE first-team All-American.

He enrolled at the University of California, Los Angeles, where he played collegiate soccer.  In his two seasons with the Bruins, he made 16 appearances.

After the 2012 season, McKenna transferred to University of California, Santa Barbara.  During his time with the Gauchos men's soccer team, he made a total of 41 appearances and tallied four goals and two assists.

McKenna also played in the Premier Development League for Orange County Blue Star and Portland Timbers U23s while enrolled in college.

Career 
On March 12, 2015, McKenna signed a professional contract with USL club Oklahoma City Energy FC.  Two months later, he made his professional debut in a 2–2 draw against Whitecaps FC 2. He made two appearances for the club.

References

External links 
 Oklahoma Energy FC biography
 UC Santa Barbara biography
 USSF Development Academy biography

1992 births
Living people
American soccer players
UCLA Bruins men's soccer players
UC Santa Barbara Gauchos men's soccer players
Orange County Blue Star players
Portland Timbers U23s players
OKC Energy FC players
Association football forwards
Soccer players from Ohio
USL League Two players
USL Championship players
Rancho Bernardo High School alumni